Jakub Jacek Bednarczyk (born 2 January 1999) is a Polish professional footballer who plays as a defender for Górnik Łęczna.

Career
In January 2019, Bednarczyk joined 2. Bundesliga side FC St. Pauli from Bundesliga club Bayer Leverkusen having agreed a contract until 2021.

On 17 March 2023, he made his return to Polish football after signing a deal until the end of the season with I liga side Górnik Łęczna.

References

External links
 
 
 

1999 births
Living people
People from Tarnowskie Góry
Polish footballers
Poland youth international footballers
Poland under-21 international footballers
Association football defenders
Bayer 04 Leverkusen players
FC St. Pauli II players
FC St. Pauli players
Zagłębie Lubin players
Górnik Łęczna players
Regionalliga players
2. Bundesliga players
Ekstraklasa players
III liga players
Polish expatriate footballers
Expatriate footballers in Germany
Polish expatriate sportspeople in Germany